Eastwood is a small triangular inner-southern suburb of Adelaide, South Australia in the City of Burnside.

It is bounded to the north by Greenhill Road and the Adelaide Parklands, to the east by Fullarton Road and the suburb of Glenside, and to the southwest by Glen Osmond Road and the suburb of Parkside.

Population

In the 2016 Census, there were 764 people in Eastwood. 73.0% of people were born in Australia and 80.2% of people only spoke English at home. The most common response for religion was No Religion at 48.8%.

Government
Eastwood is covered by the federal Division of Adelaide.

At State Government level, Eastwood is a part of the electoral district of Unley.

References

Suburbs of Adelaide